The Wandjira were an indigenous Australian people of the Northern Territory.

Language
Their Wanyjirra language, now moribund, is one of the Ngumbin languages. Tasaku Tsunoda made some early recordings of their speech, and these, together with fieldwork materials she gathered as a postgraduate student of Nick Evans, were the basis of a full descriptive published by Chikako Senge in 2015. Many Wandkora also spoke the closely related Standard Eastern Gurindji and conversations between these groups would often involve code-switching.

Country
Eastwards they were present as far as approximately Mount Farquharson, while their southern extension ran into hard sandstone country. They were present also at Munbu on the upper Negri River.

History of contact
The surviving remnants of the Wandjira now live mainly around Inverway Station, and also Birrindudu Station on the edge of the Tanami Desert.

Alternative names
 Wadshora.
 Manu
 Manoo.

Some words
 cudibah. (whiteman)

Notes

Citations

Sources

Aboriginal peoples of the Northern Territory